Senawang-NSE Road, Federal Route 243, is a dual-carriageway federal road in Seremban, Negeri Sembilan, Malaysia. It is a main route to North–South Expressway Southern Route from Senawang.

It starts at Senawang interchange of the North–South Expressway Southern Route and ends at Senawang.

History
The section between Senawang-NSE interchange and Senawang-Federal Route 1 interchange used to be a part of the Kuala Lumpur–Seremban Expressway before being decommissioned to a federal road after the expressway which formed the North–South Expressway Southern Route was extended southwards. In 2012, this section was gazetted as a Federal Route 243.

Features
At most sections, the Federal Route 243 was built under the JKR U4 road standard, with a speed limit of 70  km/h.

The entire length of this road is located within the district of Seremban, Negeri Sembilan.

List of interchanges

 I/C - interchange, I/S - intersection RSA - Rest and service area, L/B - layby, BR - bridge

References

Malaysian Federal Roads
Highways in Malaysia